Anna Kavatha (born December 15, 1987 in Athens, Greece) is a volleyball player from Greece, who has been a member of the Greece women's national volleyball team. At club level, she played for Greek powerhouse Olympiacos Piraeus from 2010 to 2013, winning 1 Greek Championship and 3 Greek Cups.

Sporting achievements

National championships
 2012/2013  Greek Championship, with Olympiacos Piraeus

National cups
 2010/2011  Greek Cup, with Olympiacos Piraeus
 2011/2012  Greek Cup, with Olympiacos Piraeus
 2012/2013  Greek Cup, with Olympiacos Piraeus

References

External links
 profile at greekvolley.gr 
 profile at CEV at cev.lu

1987 births
Living people
Olympiacos Women's Volleyball players
Greek women's volleyball players
Volleyball players from Athens
Middle blockers
21st-century Greek women